Indarwa is a village in West Champaran district in the Indian state of Bihar.

Demographics
As of 2011 India census, Indarwa had a population of 1436 in 226 households. Males constitute 52.57% of the population and females 47.42%. Indarwa has an average literacy rate of 49.51%, lower than the national average of 74%: male literacy is 59.35%, and female literacy is 40.64%. In Indarwa, 20.12% of the population is under 6 years of age.

References

Villages in West Champaran district